Beaverlodge is a town in northern Alberta, Canada.

History 
The town was named for the Beaverlodge River, which was known as Uz-i-pa ("temporary lodge") by members of the Beaver First Nation. The first European-Canadian settlers arrived in 1909.

Geography

Climate 
Beaverlodge experiences a subarctic climate (Köppen climate classification Dfc) that borders on a humid continental climate (Köppen Dfb).

Demographics 

In the 2016 Census of Population conducted by Statistics Canada, the Town of Beaverlodge recorded a population of 2,465 living in 953 of its 1,024 total private dwellings, a  change from its 2011 population of 2,365.

Attractions 

In 2004, a Giant Beaver statue was unveiled in the town's park, which can be seen from Highway 43.

Sports 
The town is the home of the Beaverlodge Blades, a hockey team in the North West Junior Hockey League (NWJHL). The team plays out of the Beaverlodge Arena and was established in 2000.

Amenities 
The town has an arena, a public library, an indoor swimming pool and play parks.

Education 
There is an elementary school, grade K-6, Junior High students are bused to Hythe for grades 7–9, St. Mary's Catholic School is available for students attending grades 1–9. The high school, Beaverlodge Regional High School (BRHS), is attended by students from Wembley, Valhalla, Hythe, Horse Lakes No. 152B (Indian reserve), Kelly Lake (Metis settlement), Elmworth and St. Mary's in addition to the local Beaverlodge students.

Notable people 
Jerry Holland, ice hockey player
Simon Hoogewerf, middle-distance runner
Mel Knight, politician
Chris Schmidt, ice hockey player
Geoff Walker, curler
Matt Walker, ice hockey player
Brian Walker, ice hockey player
Euphemia McNaught, impressionist painter

See also 
List of communities in Alberta
List of towns in Alberta
CFS Beaverlodge
South Peace Centennial Museum

References

External links 

1929 establishments in Alberta
Towns in Alberta
Populated places established in 1929